The Pays de Waes is a preserved tank locomotive built in 1844, which is part of the historical collection of the National Railway Company of Belgium (SNCB), on display at Train World. It is reputed to be the oldest preserved locomotive on the European continent.

History
The "Pays de Waes" is the second locomotive in a series of nine machines designed by the Belgian engineer Gustave De Ridder. Built in his private workshops, the locomotive was put into service on a narrow gauge line (Anvers-Saint-Nicolas-Lokeren-Gand) that was operated by the Compagnie du chemin de fer d'Anvers à Gand par Saint-Nicolas et Lokeren (a private company) in 1845, a narrow gauge line (  vs ).

The series of nine locomotives were taken out of service between 1880 and 1890. The "Pays de Waes" was still intact in 1896 when the Belgian State took over operation of the rail line and converted it to standard gauge. All other locomotives in the series were scrapped, with only the "Pays de Waes" being preserved.

The preserved locomotive was exhibited at the 1913 World Fair in Ghent and then in England in 1925 to mark the centenary of the railways held in Darlington. It was then placed on display (starting in 1958) at the railway museum located in the Brussels-North station complex until March 22, 2014, when it was transferred to the site of the current Belgian railway museum, Train World. This required a wall to be broken at the Brussels-North station to be able to remove the locomotive. It is now displayed in Hall 1 at Train World, a witness to the beginnings of the railways in Europe. 

The locomotive is named after Waasland (Pays de Waes in French), where it commonly ran between 1844/1845 and 1896.

References

Steam locomotives of Belgium
Early steam locomotives